Church of Nuestra Señora de la Asunción (Spanish for Church of Our Lady of the Assumption) may refer to:

Church of Nuestra Señora de la Asunción (Elvillar)
Church of Nuestra Señora de la Asunción (Labastida)
Church of Nuestra Señora de la Asunción (Meco)
Church of Nuestra Señora de la Asunción (Pinilla de Jadraque)
Church of Nuestra Señora de la Asunción (Tobarra)
Church of Nuestra Señora de la Asunción (Valdemoro)

See also
Asunción (disambiguation)
 Cathedral of Saint Mary of the Assumption (disambiguation)
 Nuestra Señora de la Asunción (disambiguation)